Lesage or LeSage may refer to:

 Lesage (surname), including a list of people with the name Lesage, LeSage and Le Sage
 Maison Lesage, a French couture embroidery atelier, of Albert and Marie-Louise Lesage and their son François Lesage
 Lesage, West Virginia, a place in the U.S.

See also

 Jean-Lesage, a provincial electoral district in Quebec, Canada
 Québec City Jean Lesage International Airport
 Le Sage's theory of gravitation